Anne Kocon Stokowski (November 26, 1925 – July 26, 2020) was an American politician.

Stokowski lived in Minneapolis, Minnesota and went to Edison High School in Minneapolis. She was a homemaker. Stokowski served in the Minnesota Senate from 1979 to 1982 and was a Democrat. Her husband Eugene E. Stokowski also served in the Minnesota Senate.

Notes

1925 births
2020 deaths
Politicians from Minneapolis
Women state legislators in Minnesota
Democratic Party Minnesota state senators
20th-century American politicians
20th-century American women politicians
Edison High School (Minnesota) alumni
21st-century American women